Sioux Valley Township may refer to one of the following places in the United States:

Sioux Valley Township, Jackson County, Minnesota
Sioux Valley Township, Union County, South Dakota

See also

Sioux Township (disambiguation)

Township name disambiguation pages